Chester Zoo is a zoo at Upton-by-Chester, Cheshire, England. Chester Zoo was opened in 1931 by George Mottershead and his family.

Chester Zoo is operated by the North of England Zoological Society, a registered charity founded in 1934. The zoo receives no government funding. It is the most-visited wildlife attraction in Britain with more than 2 million visitors in 2019. In 2007 Forbes described it as one of the fifteen best zoos in the world. In 2017, it was named as the best zoo in the UK and third in the world by TripAdvisor.

History

Early history

The Mottershead family's market garden business was based in Shavington near Crewe. George Mottershead collected animals such as lizards and insects that arrived with exotic plants imported by the business. A visit to Belle Vue Zoo in Manchester as a boy in 1903 fuelled his developing interest in creating a zoo of his own.

Mottershead was wounded in the First World War and spent several years in a wheelchair. Despite this, his collection of animals grew and he began to search for a suitable home for his zoo. He chose Oakfield Manor in Upton-by-Chester, which was a country village then but now is a suburb of Chester. He bought Oakfield Manor for £3,500 in 1930. The house had  of gardens and provided easy access to the railways and to Manchester and Liverpool. There were local objections, but Mottershead prevailed, and Chester Zoo opened to the public on 10 June 1931. The first animals were displayed in pens in the courtyard.

An Ordnance Survey inch-a-mile map published in 1936 shows the area around as farmland and villages and marks the present Zoo area north of Oakfield as "Butter Hill".

Rapid expansion followed after the Second World War, despite the difficulty of sourcing materials. Mottershead had to be resourceful; the polar bear exhibit (1950) was built from recycled wartime road blocks and pillboxes. "Always building" was the zoo's slogan at the time. Mottershead received the OBE, an honorary degree of MSc, and served as President of the International Union of Zoo Directors. He died in 1978 aged 84.

Zoo design
Mottershead wanted to build a zoo without the traditional Victorian iron bars to cage the animals. He was influenced by the ideas of Carl Hagenbeck, who invented the modern zoo concept and by Heini Hediger, a pioneer of ethology.

At Chester, Mottershead took Hagenbeck's idea for moats and ditches as an alternative to cage bars, and extended their use throughout the zoo, often with species that Hagenbeck had not considered. For example, when chimpanzees were released into their new enclosure at Chester in 1956, a group of grassy islands, they were separated from visitors by no more than a  strip of water. Nobody knew then if chimps could swim. It turned out that they could not, and today the chimp islands are a centrepiece of Chester Zoo.

In 1986 the zoo was enclosed with a fence, in line with the Zoo Licensing Act 1981.

21st century
Realm of the Red Ape, an Indonesian-forest-themed exhibit, featuring threatened Sumatran and Bornean orangutan, opened in May 2007.

In January 2009, Chester Zoo unveiled Natural Vision, a £225 million plan to transform itself into the largest conservation attraction in Europe. The first phase of the plan was to be a £90 million,  enclosed African-rainforest-themed sanctuary containing a band of gorillas and a troop of chimpanzees, as well as okapi and a variety of tropical birds, amphibians, reptiles, fishes, and invertebrates, moving freely among lush vegetation. It included a water ride to take visitors through the exhibit. Natural Vision was to eventually include a 90-room hotel, a Conservation College, and a revamped main entrance that would link the zoo to a marina to be developed on zoo land, all to be completed by 2018. Plans went before the public for comment in June 2009.

The projected Heart of Africa bio-dome, along with plans for the hotel, were shelved in 2011 due to the loss of £40m potential funding when the North West Regional Development Agency was abolished.

In December 2012 planning permission was gained for a later phase of the Natural Vision masterplan. One of the largest zoo developments in Europe, Islands at Chester Zoo is a £40 million redevelopment project to extend the zoo's footprint and recreate six island habitats of Southeast Asia. As of 2017 it is now open.

A 600,000 square foot nature reserve was opened in April 2018. The reserve sits outside the boundary of the main zoo and is free for people to enter.

In October 2018, two Indian elephant calves (Nandita Hi Way, age 3 years, and Aayu Hi Way, age 18 months), died of elephant endotheliotropic herpesvirus (EEHV). From 1995 on this virus disease has caused many deaths of Indian elephants across the world in zoos and in the wild.

On 15 December 2018, an electrical fault caused a fire to break out at the Monsoon Forest Habitat. The zoo had to be evacuated and was closed. Fifteen fire crews attended the zoo along with two rapid response units and an ambulance. All mammals were accounted for and one person was treated for the effects of smoke inhalation. Some birds, frogs, fish and small insects were killed in the blaze. The zoo reopened on Sunday 16 December 2018.

Land from the monorail will be used for a new attraction called Grasslands, an open African savannah habitat and a restaurant.

Management structure
The North of England Zoological Society (NEZS) is the organisation that runs Chester Zoo and the conservation campaign, Act for Wildlife. It was formed in 1934 by the zoo's founder, George Mottershead.

The zoo is managed by an executive team led by Jamie Christon CEO and he  reports to the Board of Trustees for The North of England Zoological Society. Jamie is tasked with focusing on the One Plan Business model which supports the Strategic Development Plan and Conservation Masterplan. The executive have a particular focus on education and change through its people and culture.

The zoo employs over 650 permanent staff, increasing to over 1,000 during the main summer period, making it the largest zoo in the UK.

Layout and facilities

Mobility scooters and locker and buggy hire are available near the main entrance.

The zoo is bisected by a public bridleway, Flag Lane. For many years, a single bridge (now called Elephants' Bridge), drivable by zoo vehicles and powered wheelchairs, near the elephant exhibit was the only crossing place within the grounds. A second crossing, passable by pedestrians and mobility scooters, called Bats' Bridge, opened in April 2008 near the Twilight Zone, has improved the ability of visitors to circulate.

Chester's catering facilities include Bembé Kitchen near the main entrance which opened in 2006. June's Pavilion is on the west of the zoo and Manado Street Kitchen is found on Sulawesi in the Islands exhibit. The Oakfield Restaurant, in a Victorian mansion house near the lion enclosure, and the Acorn Bar, are both used for private functions as well as catering to zoo visitors.

There are children's play areas, shops, kiosks and several picnic lawns around the zoo. A second pedestrian entrance is located in the southeast corner of the zoo behind Oakfield House.

For a long time the public entrance was at the east end off Caughall Road. In recent years the public entrance has moved to the north side with dedicated access off the A41 Chester By-Pass. Thus the zoo is entered in the 'newer' part west of Flag Lane, near the elephants, and the old car parks at the east end are being built over with service and educational buildings.

The zoo owns land outside the public area, and uses that land to grow food for its herbivorous animals.

Species and animals

Chester Zoo holds a large and diverse collection. At the end of 2007, over half the species at the zoo appeared on the IUCN Red List and 155 were classified as threatened species. 134 species were kept as part of a managed captive breeding programme. The zoo manages the studbooks for Congo buffalo, jaguar, blue-eyed cockatoo, Madagascan tree boa, gemsbok (all ESB species), black rhinoceros, Ecuadorian amazon parrot, Mindanao writhe-billed hornbill, Sumatran tiger and Rodrigues flying fox (all EEP species). In addition, Chester holds 265 threatened plant species.
At the end of 2015, Chester zoo became the first zoo outside of New Zealand to breed the tuatara.

Animal exhibits

Islands at Chester Zoo
The zoo opened Islands at Chester Zoo in July 2015, a project extending the footprint of the zoo by 15 acres and built to the south of the west half of the current site.

Islands showcases areas where the zoo is involved in conservation programmes, including Sumatra, the Philippines and Indonesia. Visitors are able to walk between the islands via a series of bridges and can also view the animals whilst on a boat trip. The project also includes educational exhibits, play areas and a restaurant, the Manado Street Kitchen.
The exhibit is opening in phases with phase one including a boat trip around the enclosures for visitors to view some of the zoo's key species from South East Asia, including Visayan warty pigs, southern cassowary, Javan banteng, lowland anoa and North Sulawesi babirusa; plus a walk-through bird aviary featuring the critically endangered Bali starling, as well as Java sparrows, pied imperial pigeons and purple-naped lories .

Phase two opened later in the summer and includes Sumatran tigers, Sunda gharials, and other reptiles (such as tentacled snakes and brown tortoises), birds (Javan rhinoceros hornbills, and Indonesian songbirds) and invertebrates. That phase including Monsoon Forest is now complete and open with the installation of the Sumatran orangutans and the arrival of a breeding pair of Javan silvery gibbons in December 2015.

A third phase for Islands opened in summer 2017. The third phase included new exhibits for Malayan sun bear, Palawan binturongs, Malayan tapir, and a new songbird aviary featuring various birds from Indonesia as well as the critically endangered Javan green magpie. The magpies are, sometimes, off-show and replaced by sumatran laughingthrush.

An exhibit for dusky pademelons and Goodfellow's tree-kangaroo was completed and opened in May 2018, alongside enclosures for cloud rats and Prevost's squirrels.

Monsoon Forest reopened in late 2020, having been renovated following the 2018 fire that gutted much of the building and caused the deaths of some smaller species. The new Monsoon Forest continues to be themed around the rainforests of South East Asia and features a large free-flight bird area exhibiting many species of South East Asian bird. Birds on display include victoria crowned pigeon, black-browed barbet, white-rumped shama, chestnut-backed thrush, asian fairy bluebird, superb fruit dove, fire-tufted barbet, black-naped oriole and blue-crowned hanging parrots. Also exhibited are a variety of South East Asian invertebrates, fish, small mammals, amphibians and reptiles, including tentacled snake, vampire crabs, several species of tortoise and Sunda gharials.

There are also further enclosures for the zoo's rhinoceros hornbill, Sulawesi crested macaque, silvery gibbon and Sumatran orangutans.

Elephants of the Asian Forest

Chester was the first zoo in the UK to successfully breed Asian elephants in captivity. The most famous of these was Jubilee (1977–2003), so named as he was born in 1977, the year of the Queen's Silver Jubilee. The zoo currently has a breeding herd of six elephants, composed of two males and four females.

The elephant house also used to house African elephants, rhinos, hippos and tapirs. Motty, a hybrid African-Asian elephant calf was born in July 1978, but died in infancy.

A £2 million breeding facility modelled on an Assam rainforest called Elephants of the Asian Forest opened in Easter 2006 as a major alteration of the zoo's previous elephant house. Inside the elephant house, other indigenous Asian species are exhibited, including, azure-winged magpies, red-billed blue magpies, great Indian hornbills,  swinhoe's striped squirrels,  and northern Luzon giant cloud rats. The former arowana aquarium now holds various species of Asiatic fish.

For recent research into a disease risk, see Elephant endotheliotropic herpesvirus.

Spirit of the Jaguar

Spirit of the Jaguar was opened in 2001 and is sponsored by Jaguar Cars and was designed by McCormick Architecture. The exhibit is split into four sections. The two inside are modelled on a rainforest and a dry savannah, and the two outside contain rivers and pools so that the jaguars can exercise their swimming skills. A new breeding pair of jaguars, Napo (spotted male) and Goshi (black female) arrived from separate French zoos in spring 2013.  Goshi died in January 2022.

The jaguars inhabit one of the four exhibits. The others house a family of bush dogs. Chilean pudú are housed adjacent to the bush dogs. Spirit of the Jaguar is also home to a colony of leaf-cutter ants, lake titicaca frogs, sloths, and an aquarium featuring numerous rainforest fish such as discus fish and shoals of tetra. The exhibit went through another makeover in late 2011, and now has a theme focusing on human/wildlife conflict. An outdoor enclosure for two-toed sloths is located just outside which also houses Azara's agouti.

Realm of the Red Ape

Realm of the Red Ape is a £3.5 million extension to the existing orangutan house, home to Bornean orangutans, and was the most expensive capital project in the zoo's history before the construction of Islands. The exhibit opened to the public on 26 May 2007 after a two-year construction period. It comprises a new two-story building linked to the existing orangutan house with three indoor and two outdoor enclosures, providing accommodation for a larger number of apes. The outdoor areas can be viewed from a first floor public gallery and feature mesh roofs supported by tree-like structures which act as climbing frames for the apes. A male Sumatran orangutan was born at the zoo in November 2019. A further enclosure houses a group of lar gibbons.

Animals and plants from Indonesia are exhibited inside Realm of the Red Ape in a rainforest-themed setting. Birds on display include blue-crowned hanging parrots, Timor sparrows, chestnut-backed thrushes, roul-roul partridges, superb fruit doves and black-naped fruit doves.  chinese Crocodile lizard  , reticulated pythons, red-tailed racers, Bell's angle-head lizards, Chinese water dragons, emerald tree monitors, white-lipped tree vipers and tokay geckos feature among the reptiles. Invertebrates include rhinoceros beetles, golden silk spiders, jungle nymphs, common crows, Malaysian katydids and leaf insects.

Located next to Realm of the Red Ape is an enclosure for Asian small-clawed otters and North sulawesi babirusa. The zoo's Sumatran orangutans were relocated from Realm of the Red Ape to a new exhibit in the Islands development during January 2016 but temporarily moved back from 2018 to 2020 due to the fire at monsoon forest

The Chimpanzee Breeding Centre

This pavilion was opened in 1989 by Diana, Princess of Wales and Countess of Chester, and is home to 26 western chimpanzees. This is the largest colony of chimps in Europe, housed in the Roundhouse, a conical indoor enclosure linked to an outside moated island. The island is planted with many bushes and has large poles for the chimps to climb on. The inside area has a climbing frame that allows the chimps to stay close together on several levels of platform. There are seven interconnected off-show dens.

Tsavo Black Rhino Reserve

The zoo's black rhinoceros exhibit, modelled on the Tsavo National Park in Kenya, was opened in 2003 at a cost of GBP2 million. The zoo has a successful breeding programme for the eastern black rhino and has successfully bred 8 calves between 2008 and 2018. Meerkats are kept in an enclosure nearby.

The Wetlands and Tsavo Bird Safari
The Wetlands features a large African wetland aviary alongside Tsavo and is home to black storks, grey crowned cranes, black crowned cranes, Baer's pochards, white-headed ducks, white-faced whistling ducks and other waterfowl. the aviary was formerly used for Dalmatian pelicans

In 2009, a walk-through bird safari with African bird species opened. It currently houses  lilac-breasted rollers, hamerkops, weaver birds, blacksmith plovers, red-winged starling, white-crowned robin-chat, white-crested turacos and a variety of guineafowl.

Adjacent to the Bird Safari is a large pen for Wattled Crane.

Latin American Wetlands Aviary
Formerly the flamingo aviary, the new Latin American Wetlands opened in Spring 2021 The new enclosure is much larger and includes a large free-flight area to allow for natural flight behaviour for its residents.

The walkthrough enclosure includes new planting, several bird hides and a raised walkway and is themed around the wetlands of Central and South America. Various wildfowl and wading birds are exhibited, including Caribbean flamingos, saffron finches, roseate spoonbill, orinoco goose, black-bellied whistling ducks, black-necked stilts, ringed teals, brazilian teals, wild muscovy duck and scarlet ibis.

Fruit Bat Forest
Fruit Bat Forest, formerly the Twilight Zone, is the largest free-flying bat cave in Europe. The cave holds two species of bat: Rodrigues fruit bats, and Seba's short-tailed bats. It is also home to a varied collection of other species including spiny mice and blind cave fish.

Monkey Islands
Monkey Islands was opened in 1997, replacing the old monkey house, and is currently home to four monkey species: Colombian black spider monkeys, mandrills, lion-tailed macaques and Buffy-headed capuchin. Campbell's guenons and porcupines were formerly housed in the exhibit, and Sulawesi crested macaques were kept here until they moved to Islands in 2015. Visitors enter the monkey house and view the animals from a central corridor. Each species has a glass-fronted indoor enclosure with climbing apparatus and an outdoor enclosure, moated and heavily planted.

Miniature Monkeys
Miniature Monkeys, opened in May 2004, consists of two enclosures. The first is home to a pair of pied tamarins with pygmy marmosets, and the second is shared by 1 emperor tamarin and two golden-headed lion tamarins. Azara's agoutis, Geoffrey's marmosets, black-tailed marmosets, black lion tamarins, red titi and white-faced sakis have also been housed here in the past but have been moved out for various reasons.

Bears of the Cloud Forest
Bears of the Cloud Forest opened in 2004 and is home to a pair of spectacled bears and other South American animals. The purpose-built exhibit is designed to mimic the bear's natural habitat by providing trees and rocky terrain. Nearby are paddocks housing capybaras, giant anteater and Brazilian tapirs.

Guanaco and vicuna were previously housed with rhea.
The zoo's first spectacled bear cub was born in January 2017.

Secret World of the Okapi

Formerly the camel house, this enclosure adjoining the giraffe house was remodelled in 2006 to house okapi. Initially two males were kept: Dicky arrived from Marwell Wildlife in 2005 and Mbuti came from Bristol Zoo in the same year. In 2006 Dicky left for London Zoo to make way for a female named Stuma from Germany. In 2009 Mbuti and Dicky were swapped back, with Mbuti going to London Zoo and Dicky coming back to Chester. Other animals that can be seen in there are african pygmy mice, acacia rats, short eared elephant shrews and gaboon vipers. Mount kulal spiny mice, four striped grass mice and gambian pouched rats have also been kept here in the past along with various other small species. The okapi bred for the first time in 2012, producing a female calf named Tafari. Four further okapi calves were born in 2015 and 2022 respectively

Dragons in Danger

This exhibit is primarily a herpetarium for the zoo's Komodo dragon It was opened in 1998 and extended in 2003 to include an outdoor enclosure used by the dragons in the warmer summer months. The exhibit is built on the site of the zoo's former bird house. In 2007, several young baby Komodo dragons were put on display after one of the zoo's two females laid eggs which hatched although the female had not been mated; this is parthenogenesis, the first such case recorded in this species. The exhibit was revamped in 2009 to house Caribbean iguanas in one section of the building. It now currently houses spiny-hill turtles, golden coin turtles, and Indochinese box turtles in one side and the critically endangered mountain chicken frogs with some blue land crabs in the other.

Dragons in Danger also houses various Indonesian and Philippine rainforest birds, such as Palawan peacock-pheasants, pheasant pigeons, Montserrat orioles and javan green magpies. Recently added was a pair of Philippine mouse deer which have successfully bred. Formerly housed here were Ploughshare tortoises, collared iguanas and Montserrat tarantulas which Chester bred in 2016 for the first time in captivity. Other former species kept in the exhibit include Socorro doves, Mindanao bleeding-hearts, Papuan lorikeets and Saint Lucia parrot, visayan tarictic hornbill and red birds of paradise.

Mongoose Mania
Located near the former tiger enclosure, this area used to be a petting farm, but was closed due to an outbreak of foot-and-mouth disease. The petting farm is now a picnic lawn and a former kune kune pig enclosure has been demolished in favour of a food stall.

Mongoose Mania, which houses dwarf mongooses features tunnels beneath the enclosure which allow children to crawl through, popping up their heads into plastic domes to give them a mongoose's eye view of the world.

Giant otters and penguins
In early 2010, the Californian sea lions left the collection. Over the late winter the pool was converted to house a new species to the zoo. The giant otters went on show for the first time on 26 March 2010. The zoo bred their first pups in 2013.

In the neighbouring enclosure, a large breeding group of over 50 Humboldt penguins have their own pool, and visitors can watch the birds from an underwater viewing window.

Tropical Realm

Chester's Tropical Realm is Britain's largest tropical house at over 26,000 cubic metres. Opened in 1964, most of the interior is an open-plan space extending to roof level and themed with pools and mature tropical plants, with pathways for visitors through the undergrowth. Here, more than 30 species of birds are free-flying, including Nicobar pigeons, various species of starlings and ground birds such as crested partridges.

Aviaries and vivaria are arranged around the sides of the building; those on the upper level were originally designed for birds-of-paradise and the hornbill aviaries were originally made for gorillas. The aviaries currently house birds like Sunda wrinkled hornbills, rhinoceros hornbills, two pairs of tarictic hornbill (one pure-bred and one hybrid), writhed-billed hornbills, schalow's turacos, Palawan peacock-pheasants, Congo peafowl, Bali starlings, blue-crowned pigeons, fairy-bluebirds, white-rumped shama, white-crested turacos, snowy-crowned robin-chats, Mindanao bleeding-hearts green aracari and Luzon scops owls. At the entrance is an aviary for Sumatran Laughingthrush.

The Tropical Realm is also the centre of the reptile collection. The crocodile pools (which formerly housed West African dwarf crocodiles, American alligators and Philippine crocodiles) currently house spectacled caimans in one and white-winged wood ducks in another
. Near the entrance is an enclosure for tuataras. This lizard-like species from New Zealand is the last surviving sphenodont, a prehistoric group of reptiles, and Chester is the only British zoo to exhibit them. In February 2016, a tuatara hatched for the first time outside of New Zealand, leading Chester Zoo to be the only zoo to have bred them anywhere else. There were many varieties of snakes and lizards in the past (many had to depart as a result); emerald tree boas  now being the only remaining. The lizard collection is now made up of Serrated casquehead iguanas, Graham's anoles, caiman lizards, and a Parson's chameleon.

Tortoises are represented by radiated. Amphibians include poison dart frogs, golden mantellas, a Rio Cauca caecilian, Borneo eared frogs and Morelet's tree frogs.

There is also a pair of Philippine mouse-deer near the poison dart frogs.

In the winter of 2015/2016 the former yellow breasted capuchin exhibit at the rear of Tropical Realm was converted to house a pair of aye-aye and a group of Malagasy giant jumping rats. The outdoor area houses a group of cotton-top tamarins.

European Aviary
This aviary was formerly home to Andean condors and American Black vulture but is now the home to a variety of European birds after Europe on the Edge was demolished in late 2017. The species include here consist of European black vultures, (being the zoo's largest birds of prey). There are also Eurasian spoonbills, northern bald ibises and little egrets as well as a selection of waterfowl. Smaller birds include rock doves, azure-winged magpies and the native but rare red-billed chough.

Rare Parrot Breeding Centre

Parrots housed off-show here include red-vented cockatoos, lesser sulphur-crested cockatoos, red-and-blue lories, Mount Apo lorikeets and blue-and-yellow macaws. The only ones on show are Ecuador amazons. Most of the birds were moved to the Rare Parrot Breeding Centre from the old parrot house when it was demolished in 2005 to make way for Realm of the Red Ape.

Magnificent Macaws
This exhibit consists of two aviaries housing rare and endangered South American parrots and macaws. These include great green macaws, in the aviary outside of the Tropical Realm and blue-throated macaws and elegant crested tinamous in the other, next to the Sand Lizards.

Aquarium
The aquarium is a small and traditional building (one of the oldest at the zoo, built by George Mottershead's daughter and son-in-law in the 1950s) housing a varied collection of freshwater and marine fish, aquatic invertebrates and amphibians. It has had notable success breeding seahorses and achieved the first captive breeding of the freshwater motoro stingray.

Other notable fish include Pinstripe Dambas, Mudskippers, tropical reef fish and various Lake Malawi cichlids. Invertebrates such as starfish, sea urchins and several species of coral and shrimps are housed with the fish.

Asian Plains and paddocks

In 2008, Asian Plains received its official opening. Based around a mixed-species paddock featuring Burmese brow-antlered deer, the exhibit has recently been extended to include new enclosures for greater one-horned rhinoceros.

The male rhino was joined by a female in 2008 to form a pair which the zoo hoped would breed. Sadly in November 2009 the male Indian rhino Patna was put down due to a longstanding leg injury. The zoo obtained a replacement male from Edinburgh Zoo in March 2010. Since they were closely related the previous female departed for a zoo in Spain shortly after, and the zoo are in the progress of creating a breeding situation – Baabu has now been exchanged for Beni from Pilsen Zoo. 2 Indian rhino calves have been born on the plain, the most recent, a male was born May 2018. The paddocks formerly housed barasingha, Ankole cattle, blackbuck and sitatunga.

Other paddocks on the west side of the zoo support grazing herds of Grévy's zebras, sitatunga, Kirk's dik-diks, eastern bongo, roan antelope.

Przewalski's horses left the collection in 2010 to make way for the new African hunting dog enclosure. Other animals formerly housed here were Père David's deer, red-necked wallabies, ostriches , gemsbok, scimitar horned oryx , southern lesser kudu and emus.

Mkomazi National Park Painted Dogs Conserve
In 2011, a new exhibit housing African painted dogs on the site of the former Przewalski's horse paddock was opened. In the style of an African research station with an African village, the exhibit has a dry landscape with fake kopje stones. A pack of African painted dogs are the main exhibit and the first breeding occurred in 2017. Aardvarks and rock hyraxes are nearby.

Madagascar
In 2019, the zoo opened a new Madagascar-themed zone close to the former lion enclosure. The area showcases the zoo's ongoing conservation work on the island. The central exhibit is a walk-through enclosure featuring groups of ring-tailed lemurs, red-bellied lemurs and red ruffed lemur. Nearby are additional enclosures housing Coquerel's sifakas, crowned lemur and fossa, Madagascar's largest predator. Previous residents included a group of black lemur who were moved to one of the vacant islands near Bats' Bridge in 2021.

Forest Zone
The north east area of the zoo is where many forest-dwelling species are kept. As well as the chimpanzees, okapis, jaguars and Tropical Realm, there are enclosures for Congo buffalo and red river hogs. Nearby is a large paddock and house for the zoo's Rothschild's giraffe herd. The area between the rear of Tropical Realm and the Spirit of the Jaguar has enclosures for various species including a group of native sand lizards  and an aviary for red-billed curassows.

Animals formerly displayed in forest zone include maned wolves, babirusa, warthogs, Chilean pudú, Mallorcan midwife toads, golden-bellied capuchins, visayan warty pigs, ring-tailed coatis and bactrian camels.

Butterfly Journey
An enclosure formerly housing maned wolves was demolished and replaced in 2008 by a heated butterfly house called Butterfly Journey, which is based around the life cycle of a butterfly, featuring free-flying butterflies and moths (The exotic species on show include blue morphos, giant owls, glasswings, swallowtails and Atlas moths), a cabinet of cocoons, and an area with caterpillars. Also featured in this exhibit is an area for a variety of different invertebrates and a mesh enclosure for some panther chameleons.

Big cats

As well as jaguars, Chester Zoo keeps lions, tigers and cheetahs in its big cat collection. The lions are the Asiatic subspecies found only in the Gir Forest in India in the wild. The zoo's former resident male Asoka was joined by a female, Asha, from Rome in 2006. The pair have bred on three occasions, but so far their only offspring to survive has been a male cub, Tejas, born and hand-reared in 2007. His upbringing was featured prominently in the first series of Zoo Days. Tejas left Chester Zoo for Besançon early in 2008 as part of the European breeding programme for this subspecies. Asoka left the zoo in early 2010, he was moved to Rome Zoo as part of the European breeding programme. His replacement is 3-year-old Iblis, who arrived from Planckendael Zoo in Belgium. In late summer 2011, Asha retired to Santillana Zoo and was replaced by four-year-old females Kiburi and Kumari.

In 2007, a male Sumatran tiger called Kepala arrived from Dudley Zoo to join the two resident female Bengal tigers, who left in 2008. The same year, the zoo acquired a female tiger named Kirana, but unfortunately it was discovered that the pair were related. Kepala departed to Dublin Zoo and a new male named Fabi was brought in from Prague Zoo to form a breeding pair of Sumatrans, a critically endangered subspecies in the wild. Kirana and Fabi bred and have so far bred successfully on three occasions since 2011. a  litter of  2 tiger cubs born to kiranas daughter kasarna in January 7th 2023 .

The zoo welcomed its first ever cheetah cubs in June 2011. The cheetahs are the vulnerable Sudanese subspecies – a second litter was born in 2013

Asian Steppe
Bactrian camels and onagers in a large paddock in the centre of the zoo, formerly the zebra exhibit. A paddock visible from the Bats' Bridge holds a group of Philippine spotted deer.

Other exhibits

Bordering the paddocks is a waterway running north–south, along which the water bus formerly traveled, are a series of islands that once housed a variety of monkeys and lemur residents, including ring-tailed lemur and white-faced saki monkeys, red ruffed lemur, cotton-top tamarins, golden lion tamarins, black howler monkeys and black-and-white ruffed lemur. The islands are currently vacant and due for renovation. A nearby island viewable from Bats' Bridge has previously held lowland anoa and is now holding babirusa. Bordering the waterways now are exhibits for black and white ruffed lemur, along with several gardens. There are also additional island enclosures for 
groups of ring-tailed lemur and Lac Alaotra bamboo lemur. More Dusky pademelons are also located nearby.

In the southeast corner of the zoo are enclosures housing assorted animals including red pandas, blesbok, red-billed blue magpies and the wetland bird nursery.

Near the Rare Parrot Breeding Centre is a group of aviaries currently housing the zoo's owl collection. This includes: spectacled owls, great grey owls, northern hawk owls, brown wood owls, southern white-faced owls and ural owls. The owl aviaries were recently modified. Several other avian species also share the owl enclosures, including vietnamese pheasants.

Alongside the Arara Lawn is a set of recently refurbished aviaries that house various species of Asian songbirds and pheasants.

Close to the Tropical Realm is a small exhibit showcasing endemic British reptiles, notably sand lizards and european adder.

The Zoo often has large model displays over the summer holidays featuring large life-sized replicas of prehistoric and extinct flora and fauna. From 2010 to 2019, there were several such displays held close to the Madagascar zone. These included a display of several life-sized animatronic dinosaurs, a display of life-sized prehistoric predators including extinct dinosaurs, mammals and large reptiles and a LEGO-based variant of the same theme.

Membership and adoption
The zoo has a service that gives people the option of adopting an animal of their choice, they are also given two complimentary tickets to allow them to visit the animals. They can also become members which allows them to visit Chester and a range of other zoos across the UK free of charge for a year. Every three months, members and adopters receive Z magazine, which provides updates and information about what is happening at the zoo.

Television
During summer 2007, television crews from Granada filmed at Chester for the documentary series Zoo Days, a behind the scenes look at the day-to-day running of the zoo, narrated by Jane Horrocks. British broadcast rights were sold to Five and the first 20-part series began airing on British terrestrial TV on 8 October 2007, transmitting on weekday evenings in a regular 6:30 pm slot. A second 20-part series of Zoo Days was swiftly commissioned and began airing on 3 March 2008. The third 20-part series was broadcast from Colchester Zoo, before returning to Chester for the fourth 20-part series on 10 November 2008.

In February 2009, "The History of Chester Zoo" was a contestant's chosen subject on Mastermind.

In 2014 the zoo was the subject of BBC One drama Our Zoo, telling the story of the founding of Chester Zoo by the Mottershead family in the 1930s. During the six-part series, the show reached audiences in excess of five million viewers and was nominated for two National TV awards.

In January 2016, Channel 4 began broadcasting a six-part series, The Secret Life of the Zoo, following the keepers and animals at Chester Zoo and narrated by Olivia Colman from Series 1 to 5 and Tamsin Grieg since Series 6. The series was a rating's success and was recommissioned for a second series. Series 2 aired at the end of 2016. The show has now run for ten seasons with a compilation series in 2020.

References

External links

 Chester Zoo
 rECOrd (Local Biological Records Centre for Cheshire)
 "My father, the zoo builder", BBC, 3 September 2014
 Google Earth view of Chester Zoo from above
 Link to 1936 Ordnance Survey map of where Chester Zoo is now, and around (Slide the slider at bottom left of the map to get rid of the overlay.)
 1898 Ordnance Survey map including where Chester Zoo is now Oakfields is lower-central.

1931 establishments in England
Animal charities based in the United Kingdom
Buildings and structures in Chester
Tourist attractions in Cheshire
Zoos established in 1931
Zoos in England